Berry Head is an island (Division No. 7, Subd. D) Newfoundland and Labrador, Canada.

It is not to be confused with Berry Head, a settlement swallowed up by Port au Port East; Berry Head Arch a natural feature on the coast near Lawler Bay; or Berry Head Cove in the Little Bay Islands area, all in Newfoundland.

Islands of Newfoundland and Labrador